Francesco Messina (15 December 1900 – 13 September 1995) was an Italian sculptor of the 20th century.

Biography and career
Francesco Messina was born at Linguaglossa in the Province of Catania from a very poor family. Growing up in Genoa, where he also studied and lived until he was 32, he then moved to Milan.

Art historians consider him one of the most important figurative sculptors of Novecento, together with Giacomo Manzù, Arturo Martini, Marino Marini. He is the author of some of the greatest works of the Novecento Italiano and his sculptures are displayed in the most famous museums, among which: Berne, Zurich, Gothenburg, Oslo, Munich, Paris, Barcelona, Berlin, São Paulo, Buenos Aires, Venice, Moscow, Saint Petersburg, Vienna, Washington, Tokyo.

From 1922, he began exhibiting his work regularly at the Biennale Internazionale d'Arte in Venice and between 1926 and 1929 he took part in the expos organised by the art group Novecento Italiano in Milan. In 1932, he moved to Milan, where in 1934 he obtained a tenured professorship 1934 in Sculpture at the Accademia di Belle Arti di Brera, of which he became the director within two years.

During those years, about him wrote Carlo Carrà: 

In the 1930s, Messina exhibited at important collective expos of Italian art in Barcelona, Berlin, Berne, Gothenburg, Munich, Oslo, Paris, São Paulo, Zurich, while executing various sculptures in many Italian cities. In 1936 he was appointed director of the Accademia di Brera, which position he will keep until 1944. His work was also part of the sculpture event in the art competition at the 1936 Summer Olympics.

In 1938, Giorgio de Chirico in Rome and Salvatore Quasimodo in Turin presented two personal exhibitions of Messina's work. In 1942 he won the Sculpture Prize at the XXIII Biennale Internazionale d’arte of Venice, where he exhibited fifteen sculptures and seventeen drawings.

In 1943, Messina was appointed Academic Emeritus of Italy. On the collapse of the fascist regime, he was temporarily dismissed from the academy, only because he had been its director during the fascist period. However, by 1947 he had already regained his professorship. In the same period the artist took part in the Graphic & Sculpture Expo at Buenos Aires, in the Muller Gallery, achieve a noticeable success. In 1949 he exhibited at the 3rd Sculpture International held by the Philadelphia Museum of Art in Philadelphia, Pennsylvania, together with Marino Marini and Picasso. 

In 1956 he participated with a personal exhibition at the XXVIII Biennale di Venezia. In 1963 he produced the great monument to Pius XII for St. Peter's Basilica in the Vatican, as well as the bust of Pietro Mascagni for the Teatro alla Scala. In the same year he was awarded the Michelangelo Prize for Sculpture in Florence.

In 1966 Messina was commissioned by Italian RAI to create the Cavallo morente (Dying Horse), which became the Italian national TV logo, placed at the entrance of the RAI Building in Rome. In 1968, he sculpted the monument to Pius XI for the Milan Cathedral. In the 1970s the Vatican assigned him the Sala Borgia of the Vatican Gallery Paulus VI, dedicated to modern sacred art, as his permanent exhibition of twenty sculptures with a sacred theme.

In 1974 the City of Milan opened the Civico Museo-Studio Francesco Messina in the ancient former church of "San Sisto al Carrobbio". This will remain the artist's permanent and official studio until his death, also hosting ca. eighty sculptures (gessos, polychrome terracottas, bronzes, waxes) and thirty graphic works (lithographies, pastels, acquarellos, pencil drawings) donated to the Comune di Milano.

In 1978 Messina attended two important exhibitions in the Soviet Union at the Pushkin Museum of Moscow and at the Hermitage of Saint Petersburg, both of which will open dedicated sections of his sculptures, with ca. 80 pieces on display. In 1981, in the former church of Saint Francis in Pordenone, an exhibition was held of his unpublished drawings, and in the same period a sculpture display at the Palazzo Flangini-Biglia of Sacile. Between 1984 and 1986, his sculptures were exhibited at the Theseus Tempel of Vienna, at the Hirshhorn Museum of Washington and the Gallery Universe of Tokyo.

Until his death in Milan in 1995, Messina continued his work of sculptor and painter and, assisted by his daughter Paola, amended and proofread the numerous biographies dedicated to him all over the world.

Works

Pugilatore, Turin, Galleria civica d'arte moderna e contemporanea (1929)
Nuotatore sulla spiaggia, Rome, Galleria nazionale d'arte moderna (1930)
 Monumento a Cristoforo Colombo, Chiavari (1935)
 Monumento equestre Regisole (or Raggiasole), Pavia (1937), in memory of the Roman monument of Emperor Antonino Pio destroyed in 1796
 Monumento Minerva armata, Pavia, University of Pavia (1938)
 Statue of Costanzo Ciano, La Spezia, Technical Naval Museum (1940)
 I quattro cavalli di bronzo (The Four Bronze Horses), Formello (Le Rughe) 1941–1970, Giovanni Leone Collection
 Statues of the Cimitero Monumentale di Milano, of the Church of Sant'Eugenio in Rome, and of the Christian Citadel of Assisi (1950–1960)
 Bust of Giacomo Puccini, Teatro alla Scala in  Milan (1958)
 Beatrice, Dallas, Southern Methodist University (1959)
 Marble Monument to Catherine of Siena, in Castel Sant'Angelo Rome (1961–1962)
 Monument to Pius XII, St. Peter's Basilica, Vatican City (1963)
 Bust of Pietro Mascagni, Teatro alla Scala Milan (1963)
 Cavallo Morente (Dying Horse), RAI Building Rome (1966)
 Monument to Pius XI, Milan Cathedral (1968)
 Monumental Via Crucis with Madonna con Bambino in Carrara marble and Statue of Christ's Resurrection 6m high, San Giovanni Rotondo (1968–1980)
 Portrait of Ranieri III Grimaldi, Prince of Monaco (1974)
 Stallone ferito (Wounded horse), Catania, Vittorio Emanuele III Square
 Sirenetta, Catania, Europa Square
A selection of Messina's work (ca. 100) is permanently exhibited within the former Church of Saint Sixtus in Milan. (see photo at right)

Awards
 Prize for Sculpture in 1942 at the Biennale Internazionale d'Arte of Venice
 Honorary citizen of the City of Milan from 1975. In 1979 the State Pinakothek of Munich organised a comprehensive Messina exhibition of his sculptures and graphic art.
 Honoris causa academic of the Fine Arts Academy of the Soviet Union from 1988 and Honorary Academic from 1990

BibliographyThe Medals by Francesco Messina, with essays by Jean Cocteau, Eugenio Montale, Salvatore Quasimodo - Scheiwiller, 1986. Francesco Messina: 100 anni, sculture e disegni 1924-1993, by Toubert, Camilleri, Zichichi, Loi - Il Cigno Galileo Galilei. Francesco Messina: Cento sculture, 1920-1994, by Marco Di Capua - Mazzotta. Francesco Messina: Mostra celebrativa per i 90 anni: U.Allemandi. Francesco Messina: sculture, disegni e poesie 1916-1993, by Franco Ragazzi, Maria Teresa Orengo - Mazzotta. Francesco Messina, ritratti, by Antonio Paolucci, Alberto Fiz, Eliana Princi - Skira. Cavalli e tori di Francesco Messina, Edizioni Artes 1998. Francesco Messina, Le opere e i libri, Electa 1999Lettere e poesie a Bianca e Francesco Messina, by Eugenio Montale - Scheiwiller, 2007. 
 Elena Lissoni, Francesco Messina, online catalogue Artgate by Fondazione Cariplo, 2010, CC BY-SA.

See also

Figurative art
Plastic Arts
Novecento

Notes

External links
Bio Note, on Bestofsicily.com. Accessed 28 May 2011
Gallery of works by F. Messina. Accessed 28 May 2011
Dancer, (image). Accessed 28 May 2011
Dying Horse (image). Accessed 28 May 2011
Artinvest200.com - Biography and Works of Francesco Messina. Accessed 28 May 2011
References, summary of links on Ocaiw.com''. Accessed 28 May 2011

1900 births
1995 deaths
Italian Roman Catholics
Modern sculptors
20th-century Italian sculptors
20th-century Italian male artists
19th-century Italian sculptors
Italian male sculptors
Academic staff of Brera Academy
Olympic competitors in art competitions
19th-century Italian male artists